Muhammad Ismail (r. 1865–1895), was the Nawab of Jaora in India and an honorary major in the British army. His son, Iftikhar Ali Khan, a minor at his accession, was educated at Daly College at Indore, with a British officer for his tutor, and received powers of administration in 1906.

Nawabs of India
Indian Muslims
People from Jaora